Taras John Zytynsky (born May 10, 1962) is a Canadian former professional ice hockey player who played in the American Hockey League (AHL) and French Ligue Magnus. He was drafted by the Philadelphia Flyers in the fourth round of the 1980 NHL Entry Draft.

Career statistics

Regular season and playoffs

International

Awards and honours

References

External links

1962 births
Living people
Brest Albatros Hockey players
Canadian ice hockey defencemen
Chamonix HC players
Diables Rouges de Briançon players
Dragons de Rouen players
EHC Biel players
Heilbronner EC players
Maine Mariners players
Montreal Juniors players
Peoria Rivermen (IHL) players
Philadelphia Flyers draft picks
Rochester Americans players
Ice hockey people from Montreal
Springfield Indians players
Canadian expatriate ice hockey players in France
Canadian expatriate ice hockey players in Germany
Canadian expatriate ice hockey players in Switzerland
Canadian people of Ukrainian descent
French people of Ukrainian descent